Francesco Capocasale (August 25, 1916 – August 6, 1998) was an Italian professional football player and coach.

External links

1916 births
1998 deaths
Italian footballers
Serie A players
S.S.C. Bari players
Juventus F.C. players
Modena F.C. players
Taranto F.C. 1927 players
Italian football managers
S.S.C. Bari managers
Catania S.S.D. managers
Delfino Pescara 1936 managers
Association football midfielders